Allan Davis (born 29 September 1948) is a former Australian rules footballer who played for the St Kilda Football Club in the Victorian Football League (VFL). He played as a forward and topped the club's goalkicking charts in 1971 and 73.

Davis was the youngest member of the Saints' 1966 grand final win.   On leaving the Saints in 1976 (after 173 VFL games for 303 goals) he had stints with Melbourne (41 games for 36 goals), Essendon (33 games for 27 goals) and Collingwood (3 games for 1 goal).

He later played in Tasmania with Latrobe in the North Western Football Union.

External links

Allan Davis Profile
Demonwiki profile

St Kilda Football Club coaches
1948 births
Australian rules footballers from Victoria (Australia)
St Kilda Football Club players
St Kilda Football Club Premiership players
Melbourne Football Club players
Essendon Football Club players
Collingwood Football Club players
Living people
Latrobe Football Club players
One-time VFL/AFL Premiership players